The Town of Milwaukee (not to be confused with the City of Milwaukee) was a town in Milwaukee County, Wisconsin, United States, created on March 17, 1835. A number of Milwaukee County municipalities, beginning with the City of Milwaukee, were created out of portions of it.  After the last portions of the town were annexed, it officially ceased to exist in 1955.

Geography
The Town of Milwaukee was originally co-terminous with Milwaukee County itself. In 1838, the territorial legislature divided the County into two townships: Milwaukee, encompassing everything north of the present Greenfield Avenue, and the Town of Lake encompassing everything South of the present Greenfield Avenue.

After 1840, using modern-day reference points, the Town of Milwaukee reached from Greenfield Avenue in the south to County Line Road on the north, Lake Michigan on the east and 27th Street on the west. Its neighbors were the Town of Wauwatosa and the Town of Granville to the west, the Town of Lake to the south and the Town of Mequon to the north.

The Town of Milwaukee Town Hall, built in 1872, is located in present-day Glendale.

Municipalities formerly a part of the Town of Milwaukee
Village of Milwaukee, 1838.  Later became the City of Milwaukee in 1846.
Town of Granville, January 13, 1840
Town of Wauwatosa (originally Wau-wau-toh-sa), April 30, 1840
Whitefish Bay, 1892
East Milwaukee, August 1900 (Name changed to Shorewood in 1917)
Fox Point, 1926
River Hills, March 17, 1930
Glendale, 1950
Bayside, February 13, 1953

Notable people
Henry Fowler, farmer and legislator, was a member of the town board of supervisors.
Charles A. W. Krauss, businessman and legislator was born in the town; Krauss served on the Milwaukee Town Board.
Peter F. Leuch, lawyer and legislator, was born in the town.
Frederick Moskowitt, farmer and legislator, lived in the town.
William S. Harley, engineer and businessman, co-founder of the Harley-Davidson Motor Company.

References

Neighborhoods in Milwaukee
History of Milwaukee
Former populated places in Wisconsin
1835 establishments in Michigan Territory